The Supreme Court of the United States handed down sixteen per curiam opinions during its 2017 term, which began October 2, 2017, and concluded September 30, 2018.

Because per curiam decisions are issued from the Court as an institution, these opinions all lack the attribution of authorship or joining votes to specific justices. All justices on the Court at the time the decision was handed down are assumed to have participated and concurred unless otherwise noted.

Court membership

Chief Justice: John Roberts

Associate Justices: Anthony Kennedy (retired July 31, 2018), Clarence Thomas, Ruth Bader Ginsburg, Stephen Breyer, Samuel Alito, Sonia Sotomayor, Elena Kagan, Neil Gorsuch

Kernan v. Cuero

Dunn v. Madison

In re United States

Tharpe v. Sellers

CNH Industrial N. V. v. Reese

Kisela v. Hughes

United States v. Microsoft Corp.

Azar v. Garza

Benisek v. Lamone

Sause v. Bauer

Sexton v. Beaudreaux

North Carolina v. Covington

See also 
 List of United States Supreme Court cases, volume 583
 List of United States Supreme Court cases, volume 584
 List of United States Supreme Court cases, volume 585

Notes

References

 

United States Supreme Court per curiam opinions
Lists of 2017 term United States Supreme Court opinions
2017 per curiam